Moonsault Scramble was a shuttle roller coaster located at Fuji-Q Highland amusement park in Fujiyoshida, Yamanashi, Japan. Manufactured by Sanoyas Hishino Meisho, the ride opened to the public on June 24, 1983. It held the record until the opening of Fujiyama, a roller coaster that opened at the same park in 1996, reaching  in height. The coaster was removed from the park in 2000 to make way for the construction of Dodonpa, which opened in 2001.

Ride experience

Moonsault Scramble was known for producing extremely high g-forces on its riders. As of 1998, it was cited by some to exert up to 6.5 gs on its riders. It was one of only three roller coasters outside the United States to exert such extreme forces on its riders (the others being Mindbender and Dreier Looping Coaster). The pretzel knot element (compromising two inversions) that produced these high g-forces was the only such pretzel knot inversion ever implemented in a roller coaster until the opening of Banshee at Kings Island in 2014. The pretzel knot element is different from the much more common pretzel loop element.

Height record
The height claims of coasters like Moonsault Scramble stirred controversy among enthusiasts. Moonsault's  height was reportedly attributed to decorative towers that flanked the support structure, while the actual track height measured .

References

Fuji-Q Highland
Roller coasters in Japan